Philenora undulosa is a moth in the subfamily Arctiinae. It was described by Francis Walker in 1857. It is found in Australia (New South Wales, Victoria and Tasmania).

References

Moths described in 1857
Lithosiini